Radio Aire was an Independent Local Radio station, serving Leeds and West Yorkshire.

The station was merged and relaunched as Greatest Hits Radio Yorkshire, as part of a rebrand, on 1 September 2020.

History

Radio Aire was launched at 6am on 1 September 1981 by breakfast presenter Graham Thornton – the first song played on air was Pilot of the Airwaves by Charlie Dore. The station's first news bulletin was read by Christa Ackroyd and in November 1982, she became the UK's first female radio news editor.

In 1986, Radio Aire's VHF/FM frequency changed from 94.6 MHz to 96.3 FM.

Radio Aire's studios were based on Burley Road, overlooking Kirkstall Road, next to Yorkshire Television's headquarters – it was the first Independent Local Radio station to have purpose-built studios. In the late 1980s, the studios were used for The James Whale Radio Show, which was a late night TV show, broadcast on ITV, Radio Aire and Red Rose Radio.

On 17 July 1990, Radio Aire split frequencies, forming Aire FM and Magic 828. In 1992, the name was changed to Radio Aire FM and to 96.3 Aire FM in 1995. A change of format in 1996 saw another station name change to The New 96.3 Aire FM before The New was dropped in 1998. By March 2001, Radio Aire had reverted to its original name.

The station together with Magic 828 was bought by EMAP in 1995 and it became part of their Big City Network of stations. It has maintained a generic branding with sister stations across Northern England since about 2000. Following the acquisition of EMAP Radio in 2008, the station was owned and operated by Bauer Radio as part of its 'Big City Network' (later known as 'Bauer City 1', and latterly, the Hits Radio Network).

By the time of the station's closure, most of Radio Aire's output consisted of networked programming – with local output reduced to a four-hour breakfast show on weekdays, alongside hourly local news bulletins, peak-time traffic updates and advertising.

Closure
On 16 July 2020, it was announced that Radio Aire would switch brands from Hits Radio to Greatest Hits Radio, as part of a wider overhaul.

Radio Aire ceased broadcasting at 4pm on Monday 31 August 2020. The last on-air presenter was Hattie Pearson and the last song played was "Uptown Funk" by Mark Ronson featuring Bruno Mars.

On 1 September 2020, the station rebranded as Greatest Hits Radio Yorkshire and merged with several stations in Yorkshire and Lincolnshire. The station's breakfast show is networked from Liverpool and hosted by ex-Radio Aire presenter Simon Ross, with a regional afternoon show for Yorkshire, hosted by Steve Priestley from the Leeds studios. Localised news bulletins, traffic updates and advertising for West Yorkshire are broadcast throughout the day.

Radio Aire's DAB slot on the Leeds multiplex was taken over by neighbouring station Pulse 1, which carries a local breakfast show for West Yorkshire on weekdays, followed by networked programmes from the Hits Radio Network in Manchester. In March 2021, Pulse 1 closed its Bradford studios and moved to the former Radio Aire studios in Leeds.

Transmitter information
Radio Aire's FM transmitter was located at the Tingley site in Morley, close to the A653 and junction 28 of the M62. The adjacent mast, known as Morley, is the former home of the station's FM transmissions. It continues to broadcast Greatest Hits Radio Yorkshire on 96.3 MHz and the Leeds DAB multiplex.

The medium wave frequency of 828 kHz continued to carry Greatest Hits Radio until it ceased broadcasting on Friday 30 April 2021.

Notable presenters

 
 Christa Ackroyd
 Bruno Brookes
 Paddy Bunce
 Mark Easton
 Paul Fairburn
 Stephanie Hirst
 Lucy Horobin
 Peter Matthew Hutton
 Martin Kelner
 Andy Kershaw
 Liz Kershaw
 Jason King
 Alex Lester
 Peter Levy
 Mark Mardell
 Chris Moyles
 Bob Preedy
 Steve Priestley
 Phil Riley
 Joel Ross
 Simon Ross
 Peter Tait
 Carol Vorderman
 Paul Welsh
 James Whale
 Tony Wrighton
 Simon Logan

References

External links
 Official Website – Greatest Hits Radio
 Radio Aire Archive (The History of Radio Aire)

Bauer Radio
Defunct radio stations in the United Kingdom
Hits Radio
Mass media in Leeds
Radio stations in Yorkshire
Radio stations established in 1981
1981 establishments in England
Radio stations disestablished in 2020
2020 disestablishments in England